Group GT3, known technically as Cup Grand Touring Cars and commonly referred to as simply GT3, is a set of regulations maintained by the Fédération Internationale de l'Automobile (FIA) for grand tourer racing cars designed for use in various auto racing series throughout the world.  The GT3 category was initially created in 2005 by the SRO Group as a third rung in the ladder of grand touring motorsport, below the Group GT1 and Group GT2 categories which were utilized in the SRO's FIA GT Championship, and launched its own series in 2006 called the FIA GT3 European Championship.  Since then, Group GT3 has expanded to become the de facto category for many national and international grand touring series, although some series modify the ruleset from the FIA standard.  By 2013, nearly 20 automobile manufacturers have built or been represented with GT3 machines.

Group GT3 allows for a wide variety of car types to be homologated with almost no limit on engine sizes and configurations or chassis construction or layout.  GT3 cars must be based on mass production road car models that are being built and sold at the time of homologation.  Performance of all the Group GT3 cars are regulated, either by the GT Bureau of the FIA or by a series' specific ruling body, through Balance of Performance formulae that adjusts limits on horsepower, weight, engine management, and aerodynamics to prevent a single manufacturer from becoming dominant in the class.  The cars in GT3 are designed to have a weight between 1200 kg and 1300 kg (2645 lbs and 2866 lbs) with horsepower between 500 hp and 600 hp. All cars have a very similar power to weight ratio but achieved either by high power and high weight such as the Mercedes-Benz SLS AMG   or low power and low weight such as the Porsche 911 GT3.  GT3 cars also have traction control, ABS, and built-in air jacks for quick pit stops.

History
The concept behind Group GT3 was introduced by Stéphane Ratel, head of the SRO Group and promoter of the FIA GT Championship in 2005.  The Group GT1 and Group GT2 cars in the FIA GT Championship required manufacturers to build a car based on regulations, and then develop that car to increase its performance, thus increasing the cost for the manufacturers and the customers wanting to race the cars.  GT3 was envisioned as a category that would simplify the process by combining several existing cars from one-make series, such as the Porsche Supercup or Ferrari Challenge, as well as other race cars available from manufacturers that did not fit in GT1 or GT2, such as the Aston Martin DBRS9 or Dodge Viper Competition Coupe, and allow them to all compete on a level playing field through strict control of their performance by the FIA.  This would allow drivers a bridge between smaller national series and the professional international FIA GT Championship.  Further, the category was conceived to use sprint formats for races, but manufacturers could develop and sell an upgrade kit for their cars to allow GT3 cars to be used in endurance races.  A similar category, under the same name, had been in use in the British GT Championship which the SRO Group also organized.

The regulations and homologations for Group GT3 were prepared by the FIA and ready by the start of the 2006 season, with eight manufacturers represented as the first Balance of Performance test prior to the debut of the FIA GT3 European Championship.  The International GT Open, British GT Championship, Spanish GT Championship, and Italian GT Championship all created a category specifically for the FIA's new Group GT3 machines.  The SRO Group expanded the category in 2007 with the launch of two new regional championships, the Brazilian GT Championship and the German ADAC GT Masters, exclusively running Group GT3 cars.  The British GT Championship abandoned Group GT2 cars, promoting GT3 to their premiere category, while the Belcar series reorganized their class structure to introduce GT3 as their lead class.  The French FFSA GT Championship also added a new GT3 category.

The Australian GT Championship brought on board the GT3 category in 2008 while the VLN Series and 24 Hours Nürburgring added GT3 categories in 2009.  By 2011 Group GT3 was expanding into endurance racing with the formation of the Blancpain Endurance Series as well as winning overall at the Bathurst 12 Hour, Dubai 24 Hour, Malaysia Merdeka Endurance Race, and Spa 24 Hours, followed by a 24 Hours Nürburgring victory in 2012.  Group GT3 also expanded to the United States with the Rolex Sports Car Series allowing several GT3 cars with specification wings, as well as the Japanese Super GT and Super Taikyu Series, while Nissan became the first Japanese manufacturer to sell a GT3 car.  GT3 category cars also replaced Group GT1 cars in the FIA GT1 World Championship before rebranding as the FIA GT Series in 2013. After NASCAR merged their Grand-Am Rolex Sports Car Series with IMSA's American Le Mans Series, the new United SportsCar Championship allowed more types of GT3 cars to join the GTD category, and in 2016 limited the category to only GT3 spec machines.

On 9 March 2018, it was announced that the FIA World Motor Sport Council approved the introduction of a new process, in which a minimum production number required for GT3 race cars would be enforced. Ten units must be made within twelve months as from the homologation date, twenty units must be made within twenty-four months and so on.  Following dwindling manufacturer support for their Class One regulations, the Deutsche Tourenwagen Masters (DTM) series switched to the GT3 formula in 2021, abandoning its touring car origins.

Homologated cars
, 52 vehicles have gone through the homologation process with the FIA, although some of these homologations failed to be completed or were later revoked.  Homologations expire after a period of seven years unless a request for extension is made by the manufacturer.  Currently, all homologations prior to GT3-025 have expired and not been renewed, although these expired cars are allowed to compete in national series under local approval.

Group GT3 cars can be built either directly by the automotive manufacturer or built by racing teams and tuning companies at the behest of the manufacturer.  Other vehicles have been allowed to run alongside Group GT3 cars in various series under homologations from national ruling bodies, including the Mosler MT900R GT3, Ginetta G55 GT3, Chevron GR8 GT3, Radical RXC GT3, Scuderia Cameron Glickenhaus SCG 003C, Emil Frey Jaguar XKR G3, Acura TLX-GT, Renault Sport R.S. 01 GT3, Aston Martin Vulcan AMR Pro and Chevrolet Corvette C8.R GTD.

Series
Since 2006, Group GT3 cars have been either exclusive to or in a distinct class in each of the following series:

Bold indicates an active series that currently uses Group GT3 cars.

 24H GT Series
 ADAC GT Masters
 Asian Le Mans Series
 Australian Endurance Championship
 Belcar
 GT World Challenge America
 GT World Challenge Australia
 GT World Challenge Asia
 GT World Challenge Europe
 GT World Challenge Europe Endurance Cup
 Brazilian GT Championship
 British GT Championship
 China GT Championship
 DTM
 European Le Mans Series
 ESET V4 Cup
 FFSA GT Championship
 FIA GT World Cup
 FIA Motorsport Games
 FIA GT1 World Championship
 FIA GT3 European Championship
 GT Asia Series
 GT America Series
 Intercontinental GT Challenge
 International GTSprint Series
 International GT Open
 Italian GT Championship
 Michelin Le Mans Cup
 Nürburgring Langstrecken Serie
 Portuguese GT Championship
 Spanish GT Championship
 Super Taikyu Series
 Ultimate Cup Series
 Trans-Am Series
 IMSA SportsCar Championship

Additionally, the following series allow certain Group GT3 cars to participate alongside other competitors:
 British Endurance Championship
 Endurance Brasil
 GT Cup Championship
 Supercar Challenge
 Rolex Sports Car Series
 Super GT
 Swedish GT Series
 Thailand Super Series
  V de V Sports Challenge Endurance/GT Tourisme

References

External links

 Fédération Internationale de l'Automobile

 
Fédération Internationale de l'Automobile
Sports car racing
Grand tourers